Hamilton County is a county located in the U.S. state of Tennessee. It is located in the southern part of East Tennessee on the border with Georgia. As of the 2020 census, the population was 366,207, making it the fourth-most populous county in Tennessee. Its county seat is Chattanooga, located along the Tennessee River. The county was named for Alexander Hamilton, the first Secretary of the Treasury.

Hamilton County is one of 95 counties within Tennessee. Hamilton County is part of the Chattanooga, TN-GA Metropolitan Statistical Area. The county was created on October 25, 1819. Hamilton County expanded to meet the state line with Georgia after absorbing parts of three different counties including Bledsoe, Marion, and Rhea. Part of the traditional Cherokee homeland, the county was created after the Cherokee signed a treaty in 1817 with the United States and ceded land north of the Hiwassee River. In the 21st century, Hamilton County is the eighth-highest income Tennessee location by per capita income ($26,588).

History
For thousands of years, indigenous cultures occupied this region, especially along the rivers and creeks. The area was long occupied by the historic Cherokee Nation. In the early 19th century, it was being led by John Ross. The city that is now known as Chattanooga developed at Ross's Landing, a busy trading post recognized as the center of the Cherokee Nation. Over a series of treaties with the United States between 1819 and 1835, the Cherokee had been mostly moved out of the area.

If any Cherokee wished to stay in the area, the head of the family would have to leave the tribe and become an American citizen. At the time of death, the person's heirs would be entitled to the land. Of the 107 reservations reported to Congress in 1819, only 39 were listed as fee simple. The other 68 reservations were allowed to continue as long as the family stayed on the land. Once the family moved, the land could be sold. This provision made it easier to remove the Cherokee from the area. The 1835 Treaty of New Echota provided the US government a legal basis for the forced removal of the Cherokee, opening their former lands for settlement. Some Cherokee leaders had agreed to this, in the belief that removal was inevitable and they could negotiate decent conditions for their people. The majority of the Cherokee opposed removal.

Hamilton County was formed on October 25, 1819 from portions of Rhea County and Cherokee land that was ceded to the US. It was named after Alexander Hamilton, an officer in the American Revolutionary War, member of the Continental Congress, the first US Secretary of Treasury, and one of the Founding Father of the United States.

At the time of the 1820 census, the County counted 821 residents, including 16 blacks, 39 slaves, and about 100 Cherokee living on six reservations. The original legislature ruled that John Gamble, William Lauderdale, and John Patterson, the three men who were responsible for founding the County, would conduct all county business in the county seat. The original county seat was in the home of Hasten Poe, who owned a popular tavern located near those three men's farms. In 1822 the County Court was moved to the farm of Ashael Rawlings in Dallas, Tennessee; he was the newly appointed County Clerk. After the county seat was moved to Harrison, the Dallas settlement declined. The county seat was finally moved to Chattanooga in 1835.

During the Civil War, Hamilton County was the site of an important saltpeter mine. This material is the main ingredient of gunpowder and was obtained by leaching the earth from caves. Lookout Mountain Cave was a major source of saltpeter during the Civil War. The mine was operated by Robert Cravens, who owned the surrounding property. In May 1861, Cravens contracted with the Tennessee Military and Financial Board to deliver  of saltpeter. On May 24, he reported that he had ten hoppers already set up in his cave. Cravens was also mining Nickajack Cave in nearby Marion County. In 1862 he quit mining at Lookout Mountain Cave and rented the cave to the Confederate Nitre and Mining Bureau, which mined the cave from June 1862 through July 1863. This mining ceased when Chattanooga was occupied by Federal forces in 1863. They stayed through the end of the war.

After the war, Tennessee rejoined the Union, and the state started to recover from the war. The long occupation had caused a breakdown in civil society. James County was established by the Tennessee General Assembly in January 1871 and was named after Reverend Jesse J. James. In early 1919 James County went bankrupt; it became a part of Hamilton County in April.

As of the 2017 census, Hamilton County is the fourth-most populated county in the state, with a population of 361,613. The growth rate is 1% per year over the last five years. Hamilton County has census records dating to the 1830s. The average income of Hamilton County is $26,560.

Geography
Hamilton County is one of the few counties in the United States to border 10 other counties.

Natural areas of interest
Raccoon Mountain Caverns is a show cave located 8 miles northwest of downtown Chattanooga. It was originally explored in 1929 by Leo Lambert who developed trails and installed lights and opened the cave to the public on June 28, 1931. The cave was opened under the name Tennessee Caverns.

The Crystal Caverns Cave Spider, Nesticus furtivus, is only known from this one cave. Cave guides will occasionally spot one of these rare spiders and point it out to tourists.

Ruby Falls Cave is a show cave located on the side of Lookout Mountain south of downtown Chattanooga. It was discovered by accident on December 28, 1928 when it was intersected by an elevator shaft that was being drilled to develop Lookout Mountain Cave as a commercial cave. Ruby Falls Cave was intersected at a depth of 260 feet from the surface and Lookout Mountain Cave was reached later at a depth of 420 feet below the surface. The entire project was the work of cave developer Leo Lambert. He named the new cave's waterfall after his wife Ruby. The lower cave, Lookout Mountain Cave, opened to the public on December 30, 1929. Ruby Falls opened to the public on June 16, 1930. Ruby Falls Cave, with its spectacular waterfall proved the more popular of the two caves and it is the only cave open to the public at the present time.

Areas such as Lookout Mountain including the famous Point Park, and Sunset Rock. Point Park is a national military park that is a tribute to the battle of Lookout mountain that took place during the American Civil War. Lookout Mountain was the area in which the last battle of the Cherokee Indians took place. It also as battlegrounds during the American Civil War and served as a base for General Ulysses S. Grant troops during the American Civil War. There are many other important areas to note on Lookout Mountain.

Adjacent counties

Bledsoe County, Tennessee – north/CST Border
Rhea County, Tennessee – northeast
Meigs County, Tennessee – northeast
Bradley County, Tennessee – east
Whitfield County, Georgia – southeast
Catoosa County, Georgia – south
Walker County, Georgia – south
Dade County, Georgia – southwest
Marion County, Tennessee – west/CST Border
Sequatchie County, Tennessee – northwest/CST Border

National protected area
 Chickamauga and Chattanooga National Military Park (part)

State protected areas
 Booker T. Washington State Park
 Chickamauga Wildlife Management Area (part)
 Cumberland Trail (part)
 Falling Water Falls State Natural Area
 Harrison Bay State Park
 North Chickamauga Creek State Natural Area (part)

Major highways

Government
Hamilton County has a County Mayor and nine districts, each of which elect a Commissioner to serve on the county's County Commission.

Executive Branch

County Mayor 
The citizens of Hamilton County elect the mayor every four years. The current Mayor is Weston Wamp, who has served since September of 2022. The fourth Mayor of Hamilton County, Mayor Wamp is the youngest person to ever hold the office. 

The Mayor serves as the head of the county's executive branch and as the county's Chief Fiscal Officer. The mayor oversees the budget preparation process and administers the budget and financial reports and oversees the day-to-day operations of county government, including implementation of all laws and policies. The Mayor also gives the County Commission recommendations and keeps them up to date about the county's financial condition.

Chief of Staff 
The current Chief of Staff is Michael Compton.

The Chief of Staff is appointed by the Mayor and is responsible for overseeing and coordinating all areas of county general government, and coordinating specific initiatives. The Chief of Staff also serves as a point of contact for the County Commission and other elected officials. The office's main purpose is to assist the County Mayor carry out his initiatives in an efficient and effective manner.

Other elected officials 
The Assessor of Property is elected to find and list the value of all property in Hamilton County. Property is reappraised every four years. The current Assessor of Property is Marty Haynes.

The County Clerk is elected to issue vehicle tags, marriage and business licenses, and other documents. The current County Clerk is William (Bill) Knowles.

The Register of Deeds is elected to record deeds and other legal documents, including powers of attorney, mortgages, marriages, and military discharges. The Register's office also collects and accounts for all fees and taxes. The current Register of Deeds is Marc Gravitt.

The County Trustee is elected to act as the county government's treasurer, collect county property taxes, account for money regularly, and invest temporarily idle county funds. The current County Trustee is Bill Hullander.

The County Sheriff is elected to enforce the law and protect citizens. The current Sheriff is Austin Garrett.

County Board of Commissioners 
Hamilton County has nine elected county commissioners to make up the legislative body of the county. The citizens of Hamilton County elect commissioners for four year terms to represent their districts. The Commission chooses from among its members Commissioners to serve as Chairman and Chairman Pro Tempore, the presiding officers for the Commission. They each serve one year terms.

The incumbent County Commissioners are:

 District 1: Gene-O Shipley
 District 2: D.C. (Chip) Baker
 District 3: Greg Martin
 District 4: Warren Mackey
 District 5: Greg Beck
 District 6: David Sharpe
 District 7: Lee Helton
 District 8: Mike Chauncey
 District 9: Dr. Steve Highlander
 District 10: Jeff Eversole
 District 11: Joe Graham

County Judicial System 
All Court Clerks are elected by the citizens of Hamilton County.

District Attorney 
The District Attorney serves to prosecute all individuals who violate the criminal law in Hamilton County, which is made up of the 11th Judicial District of Tennessee. The office also prosecutes all felony, state misdemeanor, and juvenile delinquency cases brought before the Hamilton County Juvenile Court. It represents crime victims in victim compensation hearings and maintains and supervises the Victim Witness Assistance Program.

The current District Attorney is Coty Wamp, having been elected to an 8-year term in 2022. Previously serving as General Counsel for the Hamilton County Sheriff’s office, Wamp is the first female to ever hold the office.

Chancery Court 
The Chancery Court hears cases involving civil matters, including domestic relations, worker's compensation, estates, trusts, contracts, review of administrative action of governmental agencies and boards, collection of delinquent taxes, guardianships, and conservatorships, dissolution of partnerships and corporations, enforcement of liens, boundary lines, breach of contract, fraud, election contests, and other matters of a civil nature. The current Chancellors are Pamela Fleenor and Jeffrey Atherton.

The Clerk and Master handles fees and paperwork associated with the court and sometimes serves as a chancellor.

Circuit Court 
The Circuit Court hears both criminal and civil cases, including adoption and divorce matters, contract disputes, name changes, as well as hearing appeals from lower courts. The current Circuit Court Judges are J.B. Bennett, Jeff Hollingsworth, Marie Williams, and Kyle Hendrick.

The Circuit Court Clerk handles the paperwork and fees associated with this court. The current Circuit Court Clerk is Larry Henry.

Criminal Court 
The Criminal Court handles both felony and misdemeanor cases. Cases are brought to the criminal court after a grand jury issues an indictment, or after an appeal is granted from a lower court. Trials in this court are typically have juries, however, a judge may hear a case without a jury. The current Criminal Court Judges are Barry Steelman, Tom Greenholtz, and Don Poole.

The Criminal Court Clerk is responsible for maintaining the records of the court. The Court Clerk's office is divided into three divisions: criminal division of the General Sessions Courts, the Delinquent Collection division, and the Criminal Courts. The current Court Clerk is Vince Dean.

General Sessions Court 
The General Sessions Court is composed of two divisions: Civil and Criminal. The Civil Division has limited jurisdiction with no jury trials. A person may represent her/himself without an attorney. The Criminal Division only issues judgments for misdemeanor criminal cases and traffic offenses. It only has jurisdiction for felony cases on a preliminary hearing basis to determine if there is sufficient cause for the case to be bound over to the Grand Jury. There are generally no juries in this division, either.

The current judges are Christie Mahn Sell, Alexander McVeagh, Clarence Shattuck, Lila Statom, and Gary Starnes. The court shares clerks with the Criminal Court and Circuit Court.

Juvenile Court 
The Juvenile Court handles all cases which involve a minor. Children are referred to the Juvenile Court for reasons of delinquency, status offenses, and dependency and neglect issues. The current Juvenile Court Judge is Robert Philyaw. He is supported in his work by magistrates that serve in the court. They are Bruce Owens, Troy McDougal, and Chris Gott in the Juvenile Court and Kathy Clark, Autry Jones, and Marsha Smith in the Child Support division.

The Juvenile Court Clerk is elected for a four-year term by the citizens. The clerk maintains and files all paperwork and fees for this court. They also act as a collection agent for the state to process child support. The current Juvenile Court Clerk is Gary Behler.

Hamilton County has an elected Sheriff. Recent past sheriffs:

 Jerry Pitts 1976-78
 H.Q. Evatt 1978-1994
 John Cupp 1994–2006
 Billy Long 2006-08 (guilty of extortion, money laundering, drug and gun charges)
 Jim Hammond 2008-2022
 Austin Garrett 2022- Present

Demographics

2020 census

As of the 2020 United States census, there were 366,207 people, 148,157 households, and 91,469 families residing in the county.

2010 census
As of the census of 2010, there were 336,463 people, 136,682 households, and 88,149 families residing in the county. The population density was 620.78 people per square mile. The racial makeup of the county was 74.75% White, 20.21% Black or African American, 0.35% Native American, 1.86% Asian, 0.09% Pacific Islander, and 1.46% from two or more races. Hispanics or Latinos of any race were 4.46% of the population.

Out of all of the households, 25.49% had children under the age of 18 living in them, 46.34% were married couples living together, 13.86% had a female householder with no husband present, 4.29% had a male householder with no wife present, and 35.51% were non-families. 29.35% of households were made up of individuals, and 10.34% had someone living alone who was 65 years of age or older. The average household size was 2.39, and the average family size was 2.95.

In the county, the population was spread out, with 21.58% under the age of 18, 63.73% ages 18 to 64, and 14.69% aged 65 and older. The media age was 39.3 years. 51.88% of the population were females, and 48.12% were males.

The median household income in the county was $46,544, and the median family income was $60,184. Males had a median income of $45,835 versus $34,342 for females. The per capita income for the county was $27,052. About 12.1% of families and 16.2% of the population were below the poverty line, including 24.5% of those under the age of 18 and 8.6% of those age 65 and over.

2000 census
As of the census of 2000, there were 307,896 people, 124,444 households, and 83,750 families residing in the county. There were 134,692 housing units at an average density of 248 per square mile (96/km2). The racial makeup of the county was 76.32% White, 20.14% Black or African American, 0.29% Native American, 1.27% Asian, 0.06% Pacific Islander, 0.77% from other races, and 1.14% from two or more races.  1.78% of the population were Hispanic or Latino of any race.

There were 124,444 households, out of which 28.90% had children under the age of 18 living with them, 50.20% were married couples living together, 13.50% had a female householder with no husband present, and 32.70% were non-families. 27.90% of all households were made up of individuals, and 10.00% had someone living alone who was 65 years of age or older.  The average household size was 2.41 and the average family size was 2.95.

In the county, the population was spread out, with 23.20% under the age of 18, 9.60% from 18 to 24, 29.00% from 25 to 44, 24.30% from 45 to 64, and 13.80% who were 65 years of age or older.  The median age was 37 years. For every 100 females there were 91.70 males.  For every 100 females age 18 and over, there were 88.10 males.

The median income for a household in the county was $38,930, and the median income for a family was $48,037. Males had a median income of $35,413 versus $24,505 for females. The per capita income for the county was $21,593.  About 9.20% of families and 12.10% of the population were below the poverty line, including 16.80% of those under age 18 and 11.20% of those age 65 or over.

Politics

Politically, Hamilton County is conservative. Along with the rest of East Tennessee, it has been supportive of the Republican party since the Civil War, even as the rest of the Solid South voted staunchly Democratic. However, unlike most counties in East Tennessee, Hamilton County is a strong two party county, with the Democratic candidate usually receiving at least 40% of the popular vote in presidential elections, and the city of Chattanooga tending to lean Democratic. In 2004, Republican George Bush defeated Democrat John Kerry 57% to 41%. The last Democrat to win the county was Harry S. Truman in 1948, although George Wallace did win a plurality in 1968.

In 2008, Republican John McCain defeated Democrat Barack Obama by a slightly smaller margin of 55% to 43%. In 2012, Republican Mitt Romney defeated incumbent Obama by a margin of 56% to 42%.
Four years later in 2016, in businessman Donald Trump's sweep of Appalachia, Hamilton County furnished the GOP with a mildly increased margin of 55% to 39% for Secretary of State Hillary Clinton. In 2020, eventual winner Joe Biden received the highest percentage of the popular vote of any Democratic presidential candidate since Jimmy Carter in 1976.

Education

Colleges and universities
Chattanooga State Community College – website
Southern Adventist University – website
University of Tennessee at Chattanooga – website
Richmont Graduate University – website

Public schools
Public schools in Hamilton County are operated by Hamilton County Schools.

Communities

Cities

Chattanooga (county seat)
Collegedale
East Ridge
Lakesite
Red Bank
Ridgeside
Soddy-Daisy

Towns
Lookout Mountain
Signal Mountain
Walden

Census-designated places

Apison
Fairmount
Falling Water
Flat Top Mountain
Harrison
Middle Valley
Mowbray Mountain
Ooltewah
Sale Creek

Unincorporated communities

 Bakewell
 Balmoral
 Birchwood (partial)
 East Brainerd
 Georgetown (partial)
 Hixson
 Shady Grove

See also
National Register of Historic Places listings in Hamilton County, Tennessee

References

Further reading
 Armstrong, Zella. The History of Hamilton County and Chattanooga, Tennessee. Savannah: Overmountain Press (1993).

External links

 Official site
 Hamilton County, TNGenWeb – free genealogy resources for the county

 
1819 establishments in Tennessee
Chattanooga metropolitan area counties
Counties of Appalachia
East Tennessee
Populated places established in 1819